is a Japanese anime television series that aired in 1979 to 1981. There were 73 episodes.  It is also referred to as Champion of Gordian or Gardian.

Original Story
The Earth had become a wasteland of deserts as the survivors work to rebuild communities. Daigo Otaki is a young orphan raised by his uncle.  Becoming an adult, Daigo discovers that Victor City was in fact planned by his father who was a genius scientist. Daigo's sister Saori had been managing it. She pleaded with Daigo to take on the inheritance that Daigo's father left him, a super robot system known as Gordian.  Daigo would join the Mechacon mechanic combat 18th regiment unit, an organization of law enforcers that defend Victor City against attacks from the Madokuta organization.

Concept
The pilot Daigo Otaki controls a small almost human-sized robot container named Protteser.  Each time Protteser is in trouble, he jumps into the next biggest robot container named Delinger.  Then finally the largest container is Garbin.

Characters

Staff
 Series Directors   Masamune OchiaiKunihiko Okazaki
 Series Composition  Yu Yamamoto
 Design   Ippei Kuri
 Animator   Kazuhiko Udagawa
 Music   Masaaki JinboMasayuki Yamamoto

Merchandise
The original released toy set comes with all 3 robots and the human pilot.  The 3 robots ranking from biggest to smallest, Garbin, Delinger, Protteser were respectively released as GB-11, GB-10, GB-09 by Popy pleasure.  Their upper sternum is also numbered 3, 2, 1.  Though these numbers do not appear in the cartoon at all.  It was sold in the US as "Gardian" under the Godaikin line. Gordian was later reappropriated as Baikanfū in Machine Robo: Revenge of Cronos.

Availability outside Japan
Anime Sols funded the legal streaming of the show.

References

Sources
Ishizuki, Saburo. Alt, Matt.  Duban, Robert.  Brisko Tim [2005] (2005). Super #1 Robot: Japanese Robot Toys 1972-1982. San Francisco: Chronicle Books LLC.

External links
Tatsunoko Pro.
Episode listing

1979 anime television series debuts
1981 Japanese television series endings
Super robot anime and manga
Tatsunoko Production
TV Tokyo original programming